As of 2004, Chechnya was the most land mine-affected region in the world.

Since 1994, there had been widespread use of mines in Chechnya placing both Russian and Chechen fighters. Russia is a party to the 1980 Convention on Conventional Weapons but not the 1996 protocol on mines, booby traps, and other devices. In addition to using hand-emplaced mines, Russian forces also deployed anti-personnel mines from airplanes, helicopters, and rockets, resulting in large tracts of mined land that are unmarked and unfenced. Most of this mining took place in 1999 and 2000. In addition, only half of the cluster munitions dropped in Chechnya detonated.  

Urban areas (including civil buildings in the capital Grozny), villages, roads, fields, woods, mountain paths, bridges, and rivers were mined. Eighty percent of minefields were unmarked. The most heavily mined areas are those in which rebels continue to put up resistance, namely the southern regions, and the borders of Chechnya. 

No humanitarian mine clearance has taken place since the HALO Trust was evicted in December 1999, after the Russian government accused the organization of espionage and arrested some of its staff. In June 2002, Olara Otunnu, the United Nations Special Representative for Children and Armed Conflict, estimated that there were 500,000 land mines placed in the region.

In September 2003, the International Campaign to Ban Landmines reported that almost 6,000 people, 938 of which were children, died or were injured by land mines in Chechnya in 2002, more than anywhere else in the world. It is an especially disturbing figure in a region whose population was less than one million people.

On April 4, 2006, UNICEF and European Commission said in a joint statement released in Moscow that over 3,030 people have been maimed or killed by land mines in the course of the second Chechen War (April 4 marked the first International Day for Mine Awareness). UNICEF has recorded 2,340 civilian land mines and unexploded ordnance casualties occurring in Chechnya between 1999 and the end of 2003.

In March 2007, a Chechen government official said that "the overall number of people who suffered from mine explosions in Chechnya was 3,067 including 573 women (100 lethal cases), 2,494 men (604 killed) and 754 children including 131 killed in mine blasts." According to Gazeta.ru, more people suffer from mines in Chechnya than in Afghanistan.

See also
First Chechen War
Second Chechen War
Land mine situation in Nagorno-Karabakh

References

External links
Update: The Landmine Situation in Chechnya Journal of Mine Action (2002)
Landmine Monitor: Chechnya Landmine Monitor (2004)country Bosniacountry Bosnia

Chechnya
Chechnya